Paratachardina is a genus of true bugs belonging to the family Kerriidae.

The species of this genus are found in Central America and Australia.

Species:

Paratachardina capsella 
Paratachardina decorella 
Paratachardina javanensis 
Paratachardina mahdihassani 
Paratachardina minuta 
Paratachardina mithila 
Paratachardina morobensis 
Paratachardina pseudolobata 
Paratachardina silvestrii 
Paratachardina ternata 
Paratachardina theae

References

Kerriidae